WJJM may refer to:

 WJJM (AM), a radio station (1490 AM) licensed to Lewisburg, Tennessee, United States
 WJJM-FM, a radio station (94.3 FM) licensed to Lewisburg, Tennessee, United States